Stark Rock is a conspicuous rock lying 2 nautical miles (3.7 km) south of Crulls Islands, in the Wilheim Archipelago. Mapped by the Falkland Islands Dependencies Survey (FIDS) from photos taken by Hunting Aerosurveys Ltd. in 1956–57. The name, given by the United Kingdom Antarctic Place-Names Committee (UK-APC) in 1959, is descriptive.

See also
 Luis Cruls
 Wilhelm Archipelago

Rock formations of Antarctica